Monday Morning Coming Down... is the first and only live album by Australian rock band Tex, Don and Charlie. It was released in February 1995 on the last day of their tour and peaked at number 96 on the Australian charts.

In Tex Perkins' 2017 autobiography Tex he says "Originally recorded live as a bonus disc for a second run of promotion for Sad But True, we realised that would mean a whole lot of people who bought Sad But True when it first came out would have to buy the album again to get Monday Morning Coming Down... so we insisted it be released as an album unto itself. So basically it's a collision of record company logic and artist morality. It probably shouldn't exist at all, being  most of the previous album and a few wobbly covers."

Owen said, "It was a really special tour and the live album showed that to us. Every song of the gig was fantastic and we put every song on the album."

Track listing

Personnel
Tex Perkins – vocals, guitar
Don Walker – vocals, piano, keyboards
Charlie Owen – guitar, dobro
Shane Walsh – double bass
Jim White – drums
Kim Salmon – jew's harp
Garrett Costigan – pedal steel guitar

Charts

Release history

References

1995 live albums
Live albums by Australian artists
Tex, Don and Charlie albums